Padegan Qods or Padegan-e Qods may refer to:
 Padegan Qods, Fars
 Padegan Qods, Kohgiluyeh and Boyer-Ahmad